Marysville School District No. 25 is a public school district in Marysville, Washington, United States.  It serves the city of Marysville and members of the nearby Tulalip Tribes.  In May of 2013, the district had an enrollment of 11,426 students. In 2019, it had an 84% 4-year graduation rate, an increase of 7% from the previous year. The district had 662 classroom teachers in 2020-2021.

Marysville School District operates one elementary school, Quil Ceda Tulalip Elementary, on the Tulalip Reservation. The Tulalip Tribes collaborate with MSD in providing an on-reservation high school, Heritage High School.

Schools

Elementary schools
Allen Creek Elementary School 
Cascade Elementary School 
Grove Elementary School 
Kellogg Marsh Elementary School 
Liberty Elementary School 
Marshall Elementary & MCEP (Co Op)
Pinewood Elementary School
Quil Ceda Tulalip Elementary School
Shoultes Elementary School
Sunnyside Elementary

Middle schools
Cedarcrest Middle School 
10th Street Middle School (Marysville Tulalip Campus)
Marysville Middle School
Totem Middle School

High schools
Academy of Construction and Engineering (Marysville Getchell Campus) 
Bio-Med Academy (Marysville Getchell Campus) 
Heritage High School(Marysville Tulalip Campus)
International School of Communications (Marysville Getchell Campus)
Marysville Pilchuck - Pathways of Choice
Marysville Mountain View High School
Marysville Arts and Technology High School (Marysville Tulalip Campus)
School for the Entrepreneur High School (Marysville Getchell Campus)

Marysville Getchell Campus
Formerly Marysville Getchell High School (MGHS), it comprises four schools, each of which was originally operated as a separate academy within Marysville Pilchuck High School and later MGHS. The latter was renamed a "Campus" when the academies became separate small schools and the "parent" MGHS disbanded.

Marysville Tulalip Campus
Formerly Marysville Secondary Campus, it is an 84,000-square foot campus which houses three separate schools operated by the Marysville School District and the Tulalip Tribes.  The structures were constructed in 2008 of newly built prefab modular units which look and feel like traditional construction. The high schools share a gym and commons center. The site is owned by the district within the Tulalip Reservation.  glowsims

Governance
The district is governed by a board of directors elected from geographical sub-districts. Each of the five directors is elected for a term of two years. The superintendent is Dr. Becky Berg. In October 2017, Deborah Parker was selected to serve as its director of Equity, Diversity, and Indian Education and continues to do so

Marysville School District Initiatives
The district offered computer science education for all elementary students through elementary computer science specialists.  Marysville has an ambitious technology focus, deploying Chromebooks to all students in grades 6-12, coupled with professional development for teachers in those grades on changing pedagogy.

2014 school shooting

On October 24, 2014, at 10:39 a.m. PST, Marysville Pilchuck High School, located in Marysville, Washington outside Seattle, became the location of a school shooting. A gunman, identified as freshman student Jaylen Fryberg, shot several students before killing himself at the school. Four students, one of whom was a cousin of Fryberg's, were killed and a fifth, another of Fryberg's cousins, was seriously injured.

References

External links
Marysville School District website
2014 - 2015 OSPI Report Card

School districts in Washington (state)
Education in Snohomish County, Washington